Joseph Stacy Jones (born May 26, 1967) is an American former professional pitcher who played during two seasons in Major League Baseball for the Baltimore Orioles and Chicago White Sox.

Jones played baseball at Etowah High School in Alabama and was a starting pitcher for the Auburn Tigers for three years. He was a roommate at Auburn with Gregg Olson. He was selected in the third round of the 1988 Major League Baseball draft. He began his professional baseball career in the New York–Penn League with the Erie Orioles. 

Jones was called up to the majors for the first time on July 30, 1991 along with Mike Mussina and Jim Poole. He made his Major League debut on July 31 against the Seattle Mariners at the Kingdome in relief of Poole and pitched two scoreless innings. He returned to the minors two weeks later with a shoulder injury and did not pitch again in the majors that season. Jones pitched in Minor League Baseball until 1997 with the exception of two games at the Major League level with the White Sox in 1996. He suffered an arm injury in 1997 and never returned to professional baseball.

References

Rochester Red Wings players
1967 births
Living people
Sportspeople from Gadsden, Alabama
Chicago White Sox players
Baltimore Orioles players
Major League Baseball pitchers
Baseball players from Alabama
Hagerstown Suns players
Erie Orioles players
Frederick Keys players
Shreveport Captains players
El Paso Diablos players
New Orleans Zephyrs players
Phoenix Firebirds players
Birmingham Barons players
Nashville Sounds players
Gulf Coast White Sox players